Ángel "Cucco" Peña (born September 1, 1948) is a composer, musician, singer, and record producer.

Early years
Born in Santurce, a district in the Puerto Rican capital San Juan, Peña and his two siblings became interested in music at an early age.  After completing their primary and secondary education, the Peña brothers attended the Conservatory of Music of Puerto Rico. Following his graduation, Peña joined the Panamericana Orchestra, which played various musical styles such as bolero, blues, jazz, rock, pop and salsa.

Musical career

After Peña left the band in 1980, he became a music director, producer, composer and arranger for a wide variety of singers and styles, such as Willie Colón, Olga Tañon, Gilberto Santa Rosa, Ricky Martin, Chayanne, Lissette, Ricardo Arjona, Luis Fonsi, José Feliciano, Celia Cruz, Franco de Vita, Willy Chirino, Juan Diego Florez, Marc Anthony, Lucecita Benítez, Glenn Monroig, Ilan Chester, Gloria Estefan, Jerry Rivera and Lunna.  Peña believes that music can be seen from three perspectives: that of the artist, the music company; and his own.  He works with all three to produce the music he believes people want to hear.

On June 4, 2021, Ángel "Cucco" Peña was the featured singer on Norberto Vélez's YouTube channel titled "Sesiones Desde La Loma Ep. 17".

First digitally produced Puerto Rican album
Peña produced Motivos ('Motives'), the first digitally produced Puerto Rican album with the participation of Glenn Monroig and Lunna. In 1983, he married Lunna and had three children, Gabriel, Juan and Ángel. They later divorced and tragedy struck when their son died. In addition to music, Peña now also produces television commercials.

Awards and recognition 
 Grammy for best tropical album, Contra la corriente, Marc Anthony (1999).
 Latin Grammy for best tropical production, Olga Tañon (2002)
 60 Cuspide Awards 
 40 Addy Awards
 20 Awards from the New York Theater Festival
 Agüeybaná de Oro Award (1993) for "Director of the Year"

See also 

List of Puerto Ricans
Puerto Rican songwriters

References

External links 
Popular Culture
 Boleros by Angel Cucco Peña on YouTube

1950 births
Living people
People from Santurce, Puerto Rico
Puerto Rican male composers
Puerto Rican musicians
Puerto Rican multi-instrumentalists
Musicians from San Juan, Puerto Rico
Singers from San Juan, Puerto Rico
20th-century Puerto Rican male singers
Latin music composers
Latin music record producers